Iordan Gheorghe Bărbulescu (born 20 January 1952) is a Romanian university professor and diplomat. He is currently dean of the department of international relations and European studies of the National University of Political Studies and Public Administration in Bucharest, as well as president of the senate of this university. He is also president of the Romanian Association for International Relations and European Studies (ARRISE). He has a doctorate from the University of the Basque Country, with a thesis on the pre-accession of eastern European countries to the European Union. He was also a diplomat in Romania's ministry of foreign affairs (1997-2003), and a member of the joint committee on preparation for the negotiations of Romania's accession to the European Union.

Awards and distinctions

In 2002 professor Barbulescu was admitted to the National Order of Faithful Service with the rank of Knight for his contribution to the promotion of Romania's foreign policy. In 2016 he also received the European Citizen's Prize awarded by the European Parliament.

References

Living people
1952 births
European Union and European integration scholars
University of the Basque Country alumni
Recipients of the European Citizen's Prize